Daniel Solas (born 17 September 1946) is a French former professional footballer who played as a left-back and defensive midfielder.

Club career 
Solas played for seven different clubs during his career: Gond-Pontouvre, Angoulême, Paris Saint-Germain, Paris FC, Bastia, Caen, and Amboise. He made a total of 318 appearances and scored 3 goals in the first two tiers of France.

International career 
Solas was a U21 international for France.

References

External links 
 

1946 births
Living people
French footballers
Sportspeople from Charente
Association football fullbacks
Association football midfielders
Angoulême Charente FC players
Paris Saint-Germain F.C. players
Paris FC players
SC Bastia players
Stade Malherbe Caen players
AC Amboise players
Ligue 2 players
Ligue 1 players
French Division 4 (1978–1993) players
France under-21 international footballers
Footballers from Nouvelle-Aquitaine